The Associated Press NFL Rookie of the Year Award is an annual award given to the top offensive and defensive first-year players in the National Football League (NFL) as adjudged by the Associated Press (AP). Winners are selected by a nationwide panel of 50 members of the AP who regularly cover the league. The AP has chosen an offensive rookie of the year since 1957 and a defensive rookie of the year since 1967.

Ballots are cast at the end of the regular season, before the playoffs. Since 2011, winners of the AP Rookie of the Year awards are announced at the NFL Honors presentation the night before the Super Bowl along with the Pepsi NFL Rookie of the Year Award and other AP awards. While several organizations recognize their own NFL Rookie of the Year, the NFL considers the award given by the AP to be its official honor, with the winners listed in the league's annual Record and Fact Book. Wide receiver Ja'Marr Chase of the Cincinnati Bengals and linebacker Micah Parsons of the Dallas Cowboys were named AP Offensive and Defensive Rookie of the Year, respectively for the 2021 season.

Winners

See also
 NFL Rookie of the Year Award for an overview of similar awards by other organizations

References
General
 
 
 

Footnotes

National Football League trophies and awards